Peoples Democratic Front was a mass front of Communist Party of India in the Hyderabad State.

Of total 25 MP seats from Hyderabad, PDF won 7 MP seats during the first Lok Sabha term. Among these seven MPs there were famous personalities who played a crucial role in Telangana Rebellion movement.

First Loksabha Members of People's Democratic Front
 Ramchander Govind Paranjpe (Bhir)
 Badam Yella Reddy (Karimnagar)
 T. B. Vittal Rao (Khammam)
 N. M. Jaisoorya (Medak)
 Ravi Narayan Reddy (Nalgonda)
 Sunkam Achalu (Nalgonda-SC)
 Pendyal Raghava Rao (Warangal)

References 
 https://web.archive.org/web/20160303185847/http://164.100.47.134/newls/state1to12.aspx?state_name=Hyderabad

Defunct political parties in Telangana
Political parties with year of establishment missing
Political parties with year of disestablishment missing
Communist Party of India